Sicienko may refer to the following places:
Sicienko, Kuyavian-Pomeranian Voivodeship (north-central Poland)
Sicienko, Choszczno County in West Pomeranian Voivodeship (north-west Poland)
Sicienko, Myślibórz County in West Pomeranian Voivodeship (north-west Poland)

See also